This is a list of public art in Anglesey, Wales. This list applies only to works of public art on permanent display in an outdoor public space and does not, for example, include artworks in museums.

Beaumaris

Gwalchmai

Holyhead

Llanddaniel Fab

Llanfairpwll

Llanfechell

Llangefni

Llanrhyddlad

Marian-glas

Menai Bridge

Moelfre

Myndd y Garn

Rhosybol

Valley

Ynys Llanddwyn

References

Anglesey
Anglesey